BWB may stand for:
 Better World Books, an online bookseller
 Binging with Babish, a YouTube cooking channel created by American filmmaker Andrew Rea
 Blended Wing Body, a form of aircraft in which the body and wing are not distinct
 Bow Brickhill railway station, Milton Keynes, England; National Rail station code BWB
 Braille Without Borders, an international organisation to develop and teach not yet existent Braille scripts for languages in developing countries
 British Waterways Board, a navigation authority in England, Scotland and Wales from 1962 to 2012
 Burners Without Borders
 BWB (band), short for "Brown-Whalum-Braun"
 Blackwater Bossing, basketball team
 Barrow Island Airport, IATA airport code "BWB"

See also
 BWV (disambiguation)